The 2011 LG Hockey Games took place between 10 and 13 February 2011. Five matches were played in Ericsson Globe in Stockholm, Sweden, and one match were played in Mytishchi Arena in Mytischi, Russia. The tournament was a part of the 2010–11 Euro Hockey Tour. Sweden won the tournament before Russia and Finland.

Standings

Results
All times local

Scoring leaders
GP = Games played; G = Goals; A = Assists; Pts = Points; +/− = Plus/minus; PIM = Penalties in minutes; POS = PositionSource: Swehockey

Goaltending leaders
TOI = Time on ice (minutes:seconds); SA = Shots against; GA = Goals against; GAA = Goals Against Average; Sv% = Save percentage; SO = ShutoutsSource: Swehockey

See also
LG Hockey Games

References

External links
Hockeyarchives 

2010–11 Euro Hockey Tour
2010–11 in Swedish ice hockey
2010–11 in Russian ice hockey
2010–11 in Finnish ice hockey
2010–11 in Czech ice hockey
Sweden Hockey Games
February 2011 sports events in Europe
2010s in Stockholm